Sovetsko-Gavansky District is an administrative and municipal district (raion), one of the seventeen in Khabarovsk Krai, Russia. It is located in the southeast of the krai. Its administrative center is the town of Sovetskaya Gavan (which is not administratively a part of the district). Population:

Administrative and municipal status
Within the framework of administrative divisions, Sovetsko-Gavansky District is one of the seventeen in the krai. The town of Sovetskaya Gavan serves as its administrative center, despite being incorporated separately as a town of krai significance—an administrative unit with the status equal to that of the districts.

As a municipal division, the district is incorporated as Sovetsko-Gavansky Municipal District, with the town of krai significance of Sovetskaya Gavan being incorporated within it as Sovetskaya Gavan Urban Settlement.

References

Notes

Sources

Districts of Khabarovsk Krai
